Wilhelmina Baird (born 16 February 1935), pseudonym of Joyce Carstairs Hutchinson, writing also under the name of Kathleen James, is a Scottish science fiction writer. She was born in Dunfermline.

Biography 
She was brought up in England, where she took up teaching temporarily while she tried to finish her MA thesis. She dabbled in writing short stories and thrillers but was published only when she retired from teaching.

After publishing the novel Mantrap in 1961 under the pseudonym Kathleen James she became inactive as a writer. She left the university and began publishing on the pages of the British science fiction magazine  New Worlds, using the pseudonym of Kathleen James.

But under the pseudonym Wilhelmina Baird she started publishing again in the 1990s with the cyberpunk Cass series. She currently lives in France.

Bibliography
Mantrap (1961)
Crash course (1993)
 Clipjoint (1994)
PsyKosis (1995)
Chaos comes again (1996)

References 

1935 births
Living people
Scottish science fiction writers
20th-century pseudonymous writers
Pseudonymous women writers